Allen Stephan de Wit (born 1 January 1992) is a South African professional rugby player, currently playing for the Lokomotive rugby team in Penza, Russia. His regular position is flanker.

Career

Youth career

Youth and Varsity rugby

He also represented them at Under-21 level in 2012 and 2013.

Senior career

Golden Lions / Lions
Six more Vodacom Cup appearances followed in the same season.

De Wit played no first class rugby in 2013, but did score eight tries in 13 appearances during the 2013 Under-21 Provincial Championship competition, including a hat-trick against the  side and a brace against the  side.

He returned to first team action in 2014, being included in the squad for the 2014 Vodacom Cup competition.

De Wit was included in the ' squad for the 2015 Super Rugby season, but failed to make any appearances in the competition.

Stormers / Western Province
At the start of 2017, De Wit moved to Cape Town, where he joined the  Super Rugby team and the  Currie Cup team. However, less than a week after being unveiled as a player, De Wit broke his ankle during a training session, ruling him out for an extended period of time. De Wit made his return, making his debut for the Stormers against the Sunwolves. He also carried on to represent the Western Province six times in the 2017 Currie Cup Premier Division. Western Province went on to win the 2017 Currie Cup Premier Division, which makes De Wit one of the few players who can claim to be a two-time winner of Premier Competition, the Currie Cup.

Southern Kings/ Eastern Province Elephants
At Southern Kings, de Wit played in the Guinness Pro 14 and represented the Southern Kings 9 times. He then moved to the Eastern Province Elephants in Port Elizabeth where he played 10 games.

Strela-Agro Rugby which is in Kazan, Russia
At the end of 2019, de Wit made the move abroad to Strela-Agro Rugby which is in Kazan, Russia coached by JP Nel. Strela has competed in the Russian Premier League, Russian Championship and the Russian Cup. de Wit represented Strela in 17 games scoring 6 tries in total. At the end of 2020 de Wit moved to club VVA Podmoskovye.

VVA Podmoskovye
De Wit made more than 30 appearances for VVA Podmoskovye and assisted them to a 3rd place in the russian premiership for the first time since 2018 scoring a total of 55 points in one season. He represented VVA on the 7s circuit in the same year.

Penza Lokomotive
He made a move to Penza Lokomotive where he will be looking to represent them for 2022 season.

References

South African rugby union players
Living people
1992 births
People from Vereeniging
Golden Lions players
Lions (United Rugby Championship) players
Southern Kings players
Rugby union players from Gauteng
Stormers players
Lokomotiv Penza players
Western Province (rugby union) players
Eastern Province Elephants players
Rugby union flankers